The Valley News is a daily newspaper published in New Hampshire, United States.

It may also refer to any of the following U.S. newspapers:

 The Valley News (Beaverton, Oregon), 1951–1962 title of the Valley Times
 The Valley News and Green Sheet, the former name (1976–1981) of the Los Angeles Daily News, in California
 The Desplaines Valley News, in suburbs of Chicago, Illinois
 The Ojai Valley News, in Ojai, California
 The Chilkat Valley News, in Alaska

Other media
 Valley News Live – brand name of news coverage of two television stations in Fargo, North Dakota